Reanuedo ("'Reanuedo") is a greatest hits album from Sin Bandera. It was released in 2009. This album was released after the separation of the duo.

Track listing

 Ves 
 Que Lloro 
 Te Vi Venir 
 Mientes Tan Bien 
 Kilometros 
 Entra En Mi Vida 
 Suelta Mi Mano 
 Cómo Voy a Odiarte 
 Junto a Tí (Feat. Vico C) 
 Amor Real 
 Si Tú No Estas 
 Si Me Besas 
 Para Alcanzarte

2009 albums
Sin Bandera albums